Fred Hicks (May 16, 1888 – October 20, 1950) was an American Negro league third baseman in the 1920s.

A native of Kansas City, Missouri, Hicks played for the Kansas City Monarchs in 1920. He died in Kansas City in 1950 at age 62.

References

External links
 and Seamheads

1888 births
1950 deaths
Kansas City Monarchs players
Baseball third basemen
Baseball players from Kansas City, Missouri
Kansas City Giants players